Achaea sordida is a species of moth of the family Erebidae first described by Francis Walker in 1865. It is found in Africa, including South Africa and Eswatini.

External links
 

Achaea (moth)
Insects of Uganda
Insects of Angola
Insects of Lesotho
Insects of Zimbabwe
Erebid moths of Africa
Moths described in 1865